Pendleton College was a sixth form college in Pendleton, Salford, Greater Manchester, England. It was established in 1973 and merged with Salford College and Eccles College to form Salford City College in 2009.

History
The college was established in 1973 from the sixth forms of the Salford Grammar School for Boys (which became Buile Hill High School) and Pendleton High School for Girls. In 1997, Pendleton combined with the close-by De La Salle Sixth Form College (a former direct grant grammar school). People from all over the Salford and Manchester area attend the college. Over the years, it has received a number of national awards for academic achievement. In September 2007, the 260-seat Eccleston Theatre was named after Salford's Christopher Eccleston. It received A-level results similar to Eccles College.

Campuses
It had three campuses:
 Sitec Centre — Netherland Street, Weaste; near the start of the M602, between Eccles New Road (A57) and Broadway (A5186).
 Pendleton Centre – Dronfield Road.
 De La Salle Centre – Weaste Lane (B5228); near the junction with Eccles Old Road (A576). A former grammar school, this campus closed at the end of the 2011/2012 academic year and the buildings were demolished in late 2013.

2009 merger
On 1 January 2009, it merged with Salford College and Eccles College to form Salford City College.

Prime Minister's Global Fellowship 
The school had its first two students attain places on the prestigious Prime Minister's Global Fellowship programme in 2009.

Notable alumni
 Chris Johnson, actor and CBBC presenter
 Catherine Tyldesley, actress

De La Salle College, Salford
 Anthony John Abbott, Governor of Montserrat from 1997 to 2001
 Laurie Cassidy, footballer
 Barry Cockcroft, Chief Dental Officer for England at the Department of Health since 2006
  Kevin Cummins, photographer (particularly of musicians)
 Fred Done, founder of Betfred in 1967, now based in Birchwood
 Steve Drath, co-founder of Priority Records
 Terry Eagleton, literary theorist, John Edward Taylor Professor of English Literature at the University of Manchester from 2006 to 2008
 Peter Eckersley, Head of Drama in 1960s and 1970s at Granada Television, former husband of Anne Reid
 John Golland, composer and musician
 Francois Gordon, British ambassador to Algeria from 1996 to 1999
 Mick Groves, singer and guitarist with the Spinners folk group 
 Terry Hall, ventriloquist with Lenny the Lion
 Frank Hayes, cricketer, played for Lancashire and England from 1970 to 1984
 Phil Jones, sports journalist
 Ged Keegan, footballer
 Walter Kershaw, Rochdale muralist
 Ben Kingsley, English actor
 Michael McDonagh, music artist manager (Ralph McTell and others), photographer and video producer/director (Daniel O'Donnell and others) 
 Simon McDonald, Baron McDonald of Salford, head of the Diplomatic Service from 2015 to 2020, ambassador to Germany 2010 to 2015, ambassador to Israel from 2003 to 2006; married to the daughter of Patrick Wright, Baron Wright of Richmond
 Edward Nally, Chairman of the Governors of Pendleton College from 2000 to 2007
 Tony Neary, rugby union player
 John Pyle, Professor of Physical Chemistry since 2007 at the University of Cambridge, and Director since 1992 of the Centre for Atmospheric Science
 Tony Wilson, founder of Factory Records
 Benedict Wong, English actor

References

External links
  (inactive)
 Digital signage by Samsung (PDF)

Sixth form colleges in Greater Manchester
Learning and Skills Beacons
Education in Salford
Educational institutions established in 1973
1973 establishments in England
Educational institutions disestablished in 2009
2009 disestablishments in England